Mururaju, Murrorajo or Pongos Sur is a mountain in the Cordillera Blanca in the Andes of Peru, about  high. It is situated in the Ancash Region, Huari Province, Chavín de Huantar District and in the Recuay Province, Catac District. Mururaju lies southeast of Lake Querococha, northeast of the lake Qishqiqucha and south of Queshque.

The Austrian Alpine Club (OeAV) survey map gives this mountain the name of Pongos.

References 

Mountains of Peru
Mountains of Ancash Region
Glaciers of Peru